"Devour" is a song by American rock band Shinedown. The song was released as the first single in promotion of the band's third studio album, The Sound of Madness. The track landed online and at multi-format rock radio outlets nationwide on May 5. As has been the case with other new singles by bands such as Disturbed, Theory of a Deadman, and Seether, "Devour" is so far Shinedown's fastest rising single to date, reaching the top five of the Billboard Hot Mainstream Rock Tracks chart in four weeks. In a No. 1 countdown interview, vocalist Brent Smith said that the single was "a letter to the President," and that it is about Smith's distaste towards George W. Bush. It is their second No. 1 song on the Hot Mainstream Rock Tracks chart.

Video
The music video to "Devour" is set in a music studio for most of the video, where the band is performing the song, with various stunts being shown throughout the video. At points during the video, the rail track in which the camera rolls on in order to get some of the shots going around the band and the dancers are visible.

At the beginning of the video, it shows the band setting up their instruments with periodic shots of a flag with Shinedown's previous "S" logo that was on their Leave a Whisper album before cutting to the performance in the warehouse. These shots also join the other elements of the video during the bridge.

In addition to various camera effects (such as slow motion and certain filter effects that changes the appearance of the film), the video also periodically cuts to Brent Smith also singing the song without a band behind him in a different setting: In an ocean-blue background with several beads of water splashing around him. These shots begin to be shown once the first chorus of the song begins.

When the song ends, the band is shown from behind the drummer in slow motion, in which Barry Kerch is seen throwing his sticks into the air (they fall onto the snares), with the other band members walking away from the camera's position.

Licenses
 "Devour" served as the theme song to World Wrestling Entertainment's pay-per-view event, Night of Champions, on June 29, 2008.
 The single was also featured on ESPN throughout the 2008 major league baseball season.
 Included on the soundtrack to EA Sports Madden NFL 09 video game.
 The song was released on July 22, 2008 for the video game Rock Band. The song also appears as a downloadable track for Guitar Hero 5 part of the Shinedown Track Pack along with "Second Chance" and "Sound of Madness".
 The song is the theme song for Real World/Road Rules Challenge: The Island.
 The song was previously in Sound Choice's karaoke catalog (the first karaoke track of the song that was released), though it has recently been removed. No reason is given towards the removal (even though the site claims that the track had been removed from their catalog), giving the notion that its only a temporary removal and not a license issue. The Sound Choice CD in which the song appears (which also features Buckcherry's "Crazy Bitch") is still available, however.
 The song appears briefly at the beginning of The Final Destination before the accident at the speedway. The lyrics of the song make a snide reference to events of the film ("it's your final hour", "smash it and crash it", "until you take us all", "what a way to go"), relating to the car crash, and Death hunting after the survivors.

Chart performance

Certifications

References

2008 singles
Shinedown songs
Songs written by Brent Smith
Songs written by Dave Bassett (songwriter)
2008 songs
Atlantic Records singles
Song recordings produced by Rob Cavallo